for the Welsh football goalkeeper see David Robson (footballer, born 2002)

David J. Robson (21 March 1873 – 1926) was a Scottish professional footballer who played in the Football League for Manchester City and Wolverhampton Wanderers as a left back. He also played in the Southern League for Millwall Athletic, Bristol City and Brentford.

Career statistics

References 

1873 births
1926 deaths
Footballers from Dumfries and Galloway
Scottish footballers
English Football League players
Ayr F.C. players
Brentford F.C. players
Manchester City F.C. players
Wolverhampton Wanderers F.C. players
Millwall F.C. players
Southern Football League players
Association football fullbacks
Wellingborough Town F.C. players